Jaume Matas i Palou (born 5 October 1956 in Palma, Majorca) is a Spanish politician. He was President of the Balearic Islands from  1996 to 1999 and from 2003 to 2007. In March 2012 Matas was sentenced to six years imprisonment for fraud.

References

Living people
1956 births
Presidents of the Balearic Islands
Spanish politicians convicted of crimes
Members of the Parliament of the Balearic Islands
Politicians convicted of fraud
Environment ministers of Spain
People from Palma de Mallorca